USS Pike (SS–173) was laid down on 20 December 1933 by Portsmouth Navy Yard, in Kittery, Maine; launched on 12 September 1935; sponsored by Miss Jane Logan Snyder; and commissioned on 2 December 1935, Lieutenant Heber H. "Tex" McLean in command. Pike was the first all-welded submarine. The welded hull allowed Pike to submerge to much greater depths than her predecessors and at the same time provided greater protection against depth-charge attacks. See the link "The Saga of the Submarine" below.

Service history
After shakedown in the Atlantic, Pike departed Newport, R.I. on 10 February 1937, and proceeded via the Panama Canal to Naval Station San Diego. In 1937-1938, she participated in maneuvers near Hawaii. Entering Manila Bay on 1 December 1939, she served with Submarine Squadron 5 (SubRon 5) out of Cavite, P.I. Departing on 20 June 1940, she cruised along the coast of China from Shanghai to Tsingtao. Returning to Cavite on 24 August, she voyaged in the Philippines.

In response to the Japanese attack upon Pearl Harbor, she put to sea on 8 December, commanded by Lieutenant Commander Willam A. New to guard sea lanes between Manila and Hong Kong. Sailing from Manila, she moored at Port Darwin, Australia, 24 January 1942. On her third war patrol from 5 February-28 March, she detected the enemy off the Alor Islands 20 February and 24 February, and off Lombok Strait on the 28th.

On her fourth war patrol, she sailed from Fremantle, Australia on 19 April, and patrolled north of the Palau Islands and off Wake Island, before reaching Honolulu on 25 May. From 30 May – 9 June, she patrolled north of Oahu. Overhauled at Mare Island Naval Shipyard, California, she guided bombers to Wake Island in December, and escaped from a severe depth-charging on 14 January 1943 during an attempted attack off Japan. Departing Pearl Harbor on 31 March, she fired torpedoes at targets off Truk from 12–14 April, and shelled Satawan Island on the 25th.

Getting under way from Pearl Harbor on 22 July, Pike sank 2,022-ton Japanese cargo ship Shoju Maru near Marcus Island 5 August. Sailing from Pearl Harbor on 28 September, she arrived at New London, Connecticut, 3 November. During the remainder of World War II, she trained submarine crews at the Naval Submarine Base New London.

Decommissioned on 15 November 1945 at Boston, Massachusetts, she became a Naval Reserve training ship at Baltimore, Maryland, in September 1946. Upon completion of this duty, she was stricken from the Naval Vessel Register on 17 February 1956, and sold for scrapping on 14 January 1957 to A. G. Schoonmaker Co., Inc., New York, N.Y.

Awards
 Asiatic-Pacific Campaign Medal with four battle stars for World War II service

References

The Saga of the Submarine
The American Submarine

United States Porpoise-class submarines
World War II submarines of the United States
Ships built in Kittery, Maine
1935 ships